Petros Protopapadakis (1854–1922) was a Greek politician and Prime Minister of Greece in May–September 1922.

Life and work

Born in 1860 in Apeiranthos, Naxos, Protopapadakis studied mathematics and engineering in Paris but was keenly interested in politics. He was a professor at the Scholi Evelpidon, the military academy of Greece.

Protopadakis was elected to the Hellenic Parliament in 1902 as a member of the conservative Nationalist Party.  He later joined the People's Party and served as Minister of Economy and later, in the government of Dimitrios Gounaris, he was the Justice Minister (1921–22). In 1922, during the ill-fated Greco-Turkish War, Protopapadakis was asked to form a government by King Constantine when Gounaris resigned after almost losing a vote of confidence.  Protopapadakis became Prime Minister and Gounaris the Justice Minister, and remained so for a little more than 3 months and was overthrown by a military coup d'état.

Death 
Protopapadakis was executed in the Trial of the Six proceedings at Goudi on November 1922, along with the other five most senior members of his government.

See also
History of Modern Greece

References

1854 births
1922 deaths
20th-century prime ministers of Greece
People from Naxos
Prime Ministers of Greece
Greek people of the Greco-Turkish War (1919–1922)
People's Party (Greece) politicians
People executed for treason against Greece
Executed prime ministers
Finance ministers of Greece